I've Lived Before is a 1956 American fantasy drama film directed by Richard Bartlett and starring Jock Mahoney, Leigh Snowden, Ann Harding, John McIntire, and Raymond Bailey. The film was released by Universal Pictures in September 1956.

Plot

Cast
Jock Mahoney as John Bolan / Lt. Peter Stevens
Leigh Snowden as Lois Gordon
Ann Harding as Mrs. Jane Stone
John McIntire as Dr. Thomas Bryant
Raymond Bailey as Joseph Hackett, Federal Airways
Jerry Paris as Russell Smith, Copilot
Simon Scott as Robert Allen, Attorney
April Kent as Grace Hoydt, Stewardess
Vernon Rich as Dave Anderson Federal's Lawyer
Phil Harvey as Dr. Miller
Brad Morrow as Johnny Bolan (12 years old)
Beatrice Gray as Spectator (uncredited)
James Seay as Fred Bolan (uncredited)
Marjorie Stapp as Spectator (uncredited)
Lorna Thayer as Mrs. Fred Bolan (uncredited)

References

External links

1950s fantasy drama films
American fantasy drama films
1956 films
American black-and-white films
Universal Pictures films
1956 drama films
Films directed by Richard Bartlett
Films scored by Herman Stein
1950s English-language films
1950s American films